Hollywood's Magical Island: Catalina is a 2003 documentary film directed and produced by Greg Reitman. It describes the history of Santa Catalina Island, California, with archival footage, stills, and interviews with residents and historians.

External links

2003 films
Films set in Los Angeles County, California
History of Los Angeles County, California
Documentary films about United States history
2003 documentary films
Channel Islands of California
Films set on islands
2000s English-language films